The Felix Ermacora Human Rights Award is an Austrian human rights award. It was established in 2005 by the Austrian People's Party, and is awarded each year by the Felix Ermacora Verein – Verein zur Wahrung und Förderung der Menschenrechte. There are two awards, one of them is awarded to journalists.

The award is named after Felix Ermacora, Austria's leading human rights expert of the 20th century.

Awards 
 2005: Georg Sporschill and Friedrich Orter
 2006: Hildegard Teuschl and Heinz Nußbaumer
 2007: Franz Matscher and Gudrun Harrer 
 2008: Christian Strohal and Alfred Payrleitner

External links 
 Website des Felix Ermacora Vereins - Verein zur Wahrung der Menschenrechte

References 

Human rights awards